The Missouri River Runner is a  passenger train service operated by Amtrak between Gateway Transportation Center in St. Louis and Union Station in Kansas City, Missouri. The eastern half of the route runs largely along the right bank of the Missouri River.

Due to state budget cuts earlier in the year, the service offered one daily round trip during the first seven months of 2022. A second round trip restarted on July 18, 2022, but was suspended again on October 24, 2022, due to a shortage of available train equipment. It was bought back again on December 16, 2022.

History

Prior services
The Missouri River Runner route was previously served by the Missouri Mules (known as the Kansas City Mule westbound and the St. Louis Mule eastbound) and the Ann Rutledge under the Missouri Service brand. The Missouri Service, in turn, ran along the former main line of the Missouri Pacific Railroad. Several of MoPac's St. Louis–Kansas City trains continued onward to Omaha and Denver. Missouri Pacific was acquired by the Union Pacific Railroad in 1983.

When Amtrak took over nationwide passenger service in 1971, the route became the western leg of the National Limited, which originated in New York. This was the first passenger train on the route to originate at a point east of the Mississippi River. It was the successor of the famed Spirit of St. Louis, which was extended to Kansas City after Amtrak's formation and renamed later in 1971.

When the National Limited was canceled in 1979, the only train serving the St. Louis–Kansas City corridor was the Chicago–Kansas City Ann Rutledge. Missouri officials pressed for the introduction of the Mules in order to maintain and improve service between St. Louis and Kansas City. Over the ensuing years of state subsidy, additional station stops were established at Washington, Hermann, Lee's Summit and Independence.

The Ann Rutledge had previously been part of both the Missouri Service and Illinois Service, but had its eastern terminus cut back to St. Louis in 2006. This gave the St. Louis–Kansas City route two daily round trips on a schedule similar to the last pre-Amtrak MoPac service. The Chicago–St. Louis State House connected once per day with the Ann Rutledge to continue through service from Chicago to Kansas City.

In 1984, Amtrak's Jefferson City depot and ticket office was moved from the former MoPac station to a renovated historic building east of the depot but closer to the Missouri State Capitol. It was hoped the relocated station would allow tourists and others easier access to the state government buildings. Jefferson City is not on an Interstate Highway; the nearest airport is in Columbia. The revived station stop at Hermann was instituted in similar fashion to encourage use of Amtrak for access the city's popular German festivals.

Missouri River Runner
In 2008, Amtrak and the Missouri Department of Transportation (MoDOT) decided to merge the Mules and Ann Rutledge into a single route. The name of the new route was announced in January 2009 as part of the "Name The Train" contest held by MoDOT.  The winning name was submitted by Keith Kohler of Glendale, Missouri; it reflects the fact that the route largely parallels the Missouri River. The other finalists were Missouri Rail Blazer, ShowMeMO, Truman Service and River Cities Corridor. The service is financed primarily through funds made available by MoDOT.

In November 2009, Amtrak and Union Pacific completed an $8.1 million  passing loop near California, Missouri, designed to improve performance along the route. It was funded by the state of Missouri and the Federal Railroad Administration and has been credited with helping to improve Amtrak's on-time performance. Due to these improvements, on-time performance has increased from less than 70% to 95%.

During fiscal year 2015, the service carried a total of 178,915 passengers, a 5.5% decrease from FY 2014's total of 189,402 passengers. The trains had a total revenue of $5,108,200 during FY 2015, a decrease of 4.4% from FY 2014's total of $5,341,229.

By 2020, the State of Missouri owed Amtrak $6.5 million in unpaid bills in addition to that year's contract amount for continued service.

COVID-19 pandemic
In March 2020, service was reduced to one round trip per day due to the COVID-19 pandemic. Amtrak and MoDOT restored the route's second daily round trip on July 19, 2021. However, this second round trip was once again suspended on January 3, 2022, after the Missouri General Assembly cut the trip from the state budget. Missouri restored full funding in July 2022 amid increased demand for public transit due to high gas prices. The second-round trip returned on July 18, but was suspended again on October 24, 2022, due to a shortage of available train equipment. The second-round trip was officially added back again on December 16, 2022.

On May 23, 2022, Amtrak began through-routing one round trip of the Missouri River Runner and Lincoln Service, creating a Kansas City–Chicago round trip.

Rolling stock
The Missouri River Runner consists of the following:
One Siemens Charger locomotive
Three to five Horizon Fleet or Amfleet I coaches 
One Amfleet I or Horizon Fleet cafe/business car

Route
One daily Runner round trip connects with the Chicago–St. Louis Lincoln Service, successor of the State House.

References

Notes

External links 

Amtrak routes
Passenger rail transportation in Missouri
Railway services introduced in 2009
2009 establishments in Missouri